The Shakerley Baronetcy, of Somerford Park in the County of Chester, is a title in the Baronetage of the United Kingdom. It was created on 30 July 1838 for Charles Shakerley, High Sheriff of Cheshire in 1837.

Shakerley baronets, of Somerford Park (1838)
Sir Charles Peter Shakerley, 1st Baronet (1792–1857)
Sir Charles Watkin Shakerley, 2nd Baronet, Knight Commander of the KCB (1833–1898)
Sir Walter Geoffrey Shakerley, 3rd Baronet (1859–1943)
Sir George Herbert Shakerley, 4th Baronet (1863–1945)
Sir Cyril Holland Shakerley, 5th Baronet (1897–1970)
Sir Geoffrey Adam Shakerley, 6th Baronet (1932–2012)
Sir Nicholas Simon Adam Shakerley, 7th Baronet (born 1963)

The heir presumptive is the present holder's brother Peter Jonathan Shakerley (born 1966).

See also
Hulme Hall, Allostock

Notes

References
Kidd, Charles, Williamson, David (editors). Debrett's Peerage and Baronetage (1990 edition). New York: St Martin's Press, 1990,

External links
Website on the Shakerley family

Shakerley